Noizegarden, stylized nOiZeGaRdEn, was a rock band from Hondae, Seoul, in South Korea, active in the 1990s.

Former band members
 Bak Geon (Vocals) (died 2016)
 Yoon Byeong-Ju (Guitars)
 Yeom Je-Min (Bass) 
 Bak Gyeong-Weon (Drums)
 Lee Sang-Moon (Bass)
 Bak Yeong-Joong (Drums)

Discography

nOiZeGaRdEn (1996)
...But Not Least (1999)

1992 establishments in South Korea
South Korean rock music groups
South Korean heavy metal musical groups
Musical groups established in 1992
Musical groups from Seoul